The elected committee that directs the Indian National Congress in an Indian state is known as Pradesh Congress Committee (PCC). It is elected by card-holding members of the Congress and in turn elects state president and delegates to the All India Congress Committee.

List of Pradesh Congress Committees 

This is a list of the official state, territorial and regional committees of the Indian National Congress.

See also 
 All India Congress Committee
 Congress Working Committee
 List of presidents of the Indian National Congress
 State units of the Bharatiya Janata Party

References

External links
 PCC website